State Route 515 (SR 515) is a north-south state highway located in east-central Ohio. Existing entirely within the northeastern portion of Holmes County in Ohio's Amish Country, SR 515 has its southern terminus at a signalized intersection with SR 39 in the unincorporated community of Walnut Creek.

The entirety of SR 515 is a part of the Amish Country Byway, an officially designated National Scenic Byway.

Route description
SR 515 begins its  journey at a signalized intersection with SR 39 in Walnut Creek. SR 515 heads easterly through the heart of this town, passing a number of business that tie in with the local Amish culture, and serve a number of tourists throughout the travel season. At the Walnut Creek Township Highway 444 intersection, SR 515 turns north and enters into rural territory. Passing a small clump of woods before entering into open farmland predominantly composed of Amish farms, the state highway passes Township Highway 406. SR 515 abuts the east side of a forest prior to passing through a northeasterly S-curve, and re-entering a landscape of farmland as it intersects County Road 172 and Township Highway 410 successively. Turning to the northeast, SR 515 next meets County Road 168, then bends back to the north, passing amid a small patch of woods prior to intersecting Township Road 415. After a few twists and turns, SR 515 descends the hill into a little valley and passes through the tiny village of Trail. Named for this section of SR 515 that was once an old Indian trail that ran through the area, and tiny enough to lack a ZIP code, Trail is now known for its famous "Troyers Trail Bologna," a regional staple of picnics and potlucks.

No portion of SR 515 is included within the National Highway System.

History
Designated in 1937 along the path it currently occupies between SR 39 and US 62, SR 515 has not had any significant changes to its routing since its inception.

Major intersections

References

External links

515
Transportation in Holmes County, Ohio
Scenic byways in Ohio